Phitsanulok Provincial Administrative Organization Stadium is a multi-purpose stadium in Phitsanulok Province, Thailand. It is currently used mostly for football matches and is the home stadium of Phitsanulok F.C. The stadium holds 3,066 people.

Football venues in Thailand
Multi-purpose stadiums in Thailand
Buildings and structures in Phitsanulok province
Sport in Phitsanulok province